Thanasis Gogas (born 29 September 1980) is a Greek footballer. He currently plays for Doxa Kato Kamila.

Career
Born in Hamburg, Gogas moved to Greece where he began his playing career by signing with Proodeftiki F.C. in July 1998, and played two seasons for the club in the Alpha Ethniki. Gogas has not played in the top flight since, as he had stints with Kavala F.C., Kerkyra F.C., Panserraikos F.C. and Ionikos F.C. in the Beta Ethniki and Anagennisi Karditsa F.C. in Delta Ethniki.

At the start of 2012 he signed for Iraklis but was later released as a free agent.

References

External links
Profile at Onsports.gr

1980 births
Living people
Greek footballers
Proodeftiki F.C. players
Kavala F.C. players
A.O. Kerkyra players
Panserraikos F.C. players
Ionikos F.C. players
Anagennisi Karditsa F.C. players
Ethnikos Asteras F.C. players
Tilikratis F.C. players
Iraklis Thessaloniki F.C. players
Asteras Magoula F.C. players
Rodos F.C. players
Association football forwards